Jose da Graça Diogo (December 1956 – 9 October 2022) was a São Toméan politician. Previously serving as Minister of Natural Resources and Environment, he was president of the National Assembly from 2014 to 2018.

References

Government ministers of São Tomé and Príncipe
1956 births

2022 deaths